Cremdean Properties Ltd v Nash (1977) 244 EG 547 is an English contract law case, concerning misrepresentation and exclusion of liability under the Misrepresentation Act 1967 s 3.

Facts
Cremdean Properties Ltd contracted to buy some Bristol property from Nash. They wanted to develop it. The true figure was much lower. Cremdean sought rescission or damages for misrepresentation. Nash sought to rely on a footnote clause in the invitation to tender document that said although statements (like the planning permission) ‘are believe to be correct their accuracy is not guaranteed’ errors would not annul the sale and pre-contract statements did not form part of the offer. Also, any purchaser should satisfy himself. Cremdean Properties Ltd argued that the exclusion fell within MA 1967 s 3 and was unreasonable.

Judgment
Bridge LJ held that the footnote was an exclusion clause within s 3. He noted that Nash’s argument that the footnote was effective to nullify representations in the document altogether (not just exclusions) and resulted that no representation had ever been made. He said this argument altogether, and that such a result would be ‘remarkable’. He distinguished Overbrooke Estates Ltd v Glencombe Properties Ltd situation had no effect here, because here the agents that published the documents always had Nash’s authority.

He added that it would be enough to go by ordinary interpretation principles, that the footnote was an exclusion. But even if an ingenious draftsman had said that ‘no representation is being made by our representations’ or something, s 3 could still not be circumvented.

Scarman LJ concurred. He said that the logic of Nash's argument was appealing that,

Buckley LJ concurred.

See also

English contract law
Misrepresentation in English law

Notes

References

English misrepresentation case law
Court of Appeal (England and Wales) cases
1977 in British law
1977 in case law